The Open Air Meeting is a  live album by Muhal Richard Abrams and Marty Ehrlich which was released on the New World label in 1997 and features duet performances by Abrams and Erlich recorded in August 1996 at the Brooklyn Museum.

Reception
The Allmusic review by Scott Yanow states "The two musicians listen closely to each other and react quickly to any ideas that the other might have. Abrams' strong technique and knowledge of other styles and Ehrlich's versatile playing prove to be a stimulating match".

Track listing
 "Marching With Honor" (Muhal Richard Abrams) - 10:55  
 "Dark Sestina" (Marty Ehrlich) - 8:31  
 "Crossbeams" (Abrams) - 7:34  
 "The Price of the Ticket" (Ehrlich) - 13:54  
 "Bright Canto" (Ehrlich) - 12:04  
 "Blues to You" (Abrams, Ehrlich) - 4:55  
Recorded live as part of the concert series "Summer Jazz at The Brooklyn Museum: Double Exposure," August 11, 1996.

Personnel
Muhal Richard Abrams: piano
Marty Ehrlich: alto saxophone, clarinet

References

Muhal Richard Abrams albums
1997 live albums
New World Records live albums